Tithby (sometimes spelt "Tythby", locally pronounced "Tidby") is an English village in the Rushcliffe borough of Nottinghamshire, about  south of the market town of Bingham. The civil parishes of Tithby and Wiverton Hall have a joint annual parish meeting and a combined population of about 95.

Tithby has 6 listed buildings including a K6 Telephone Kiosk

Location and governance
Tithby is made up largely of farms and farmhouses, much like other local villages such as Colston Bassett, Cropwell Butler, Cropwell Bishop, Langar, and Barnstone.

Tithby shares a parish meeting with Wiverton Hall. The village forms part of the Borough of Rushcliffe and of the Parliamentary Constituency of Rushcliffe, whose current member is the Conservative Ruth Edwards. The county authority is Nottinghamshire.

Amenities and transport
The nearest schools, shops and other amenities are in Bingham and Cropwell Bishop. There is a pub, the Plough Inn, at Cropwell Butler (1.2 miles/2 km).

Tithby has no public transport of its own. Its nearest bus stops are in Cropwell Butler (1 mile/1.6 km) and in Bingham (2.5 miles/4 km), which also has a railway station (2.7 miles/4.3 km) on the Nottingham–Grantham line.

Church
The Anglican parish church is the Grade I listed Holy Trinity. Tythby (the ecclesiastical parish is so spelt) is one of the Wiverton group of parishes, whose incumbent since 2019 has been the Rev. Rachel Mitchell.

References

External links

1896 account of the history of Tithby and Wiverton

Villages in Nottinghamshire
Rushcliffe